This is a list of named geological features on Io, a moon of Jupiter. See also the list of mountains on Io and the list of paterae on Io.

Eruptive Centers

Eruptive centers on Io, locations typically where major volcanic activity was observed and characterized before the volcanic landform was, are named after the gods of volcanoes and/or blacksmiths in various mythologies.

Catenae

On Io, catenae  (crater chains, sg. catena) are named after sun gods in various mythologies. In 2006, the use of the term catena was discontinued in favor of the patera  (plural paterae ). Below is a list of features that previously used the descriptor term catena.

Fluctūs

Ionian fluctus  (areas of lava flow) are named after fire and thunder gods in various mythologies, or after locations in Greek mythology associated with Io.

Mensae

Ionian mensae  (mesas, sg. mensa) are named after mythological figures associated with fire or with the nymph Io.

Montes

Ionian montes  (mountains and volcanos, sg. mons ) are named after people and places associated with the nymph Io, and sun and fire gods in various other mythologies.

Paterae

Ionian paterae  (shallow craters and crater chains) are named after sun gods and fire gods in various mythologies.

Plana

Ionian plana  (plateaus, sg. planum ) are named after locations in Greek mythology associated with the nymph Io.

Regiones

Ionian regiones  (regions, sg. regio ) are mostly named after locations in Greek mythology associated with the nymph Io.

Tholi

Ionian tholi  (hills, sg. tholus ) are named after mythological figures associated with fire or with the nymph Io.

Notes and references

External links
USGS: Io nomenclature

Io